Elina Svitolina was the two-time defending champion, but lost in the semifinals to Belinda Bencic.

Bencic won the title, despite being six match points down in the third round against Aryna Sabalenka, beating Petra Kvitová in the final, 6–3, 1–6, 6–2. For the second time in her career, Bencic defeated four consecutive top-ten players en route to a Premier 5 title. This was her first WTA singles title since winning the Premier 5 Rogers Cup title in 2015 and lifted her back inside the top 25 for the first time in over two and a half years.

Seeds
The top eight seeds received a bye into the second round.

Draw

Finals

Top half

Section 1

Section 2

Bottom half

Section 3

Section 4

Qualifying

Seeds

Qualifiers

Lucky losers

Draw

First qualifier

Second qualifier

Third qualifier

Fourth qualifier

Fifth qualifier

Sixth qualifier

Seventh qualifier

Eighth qualifier

References

External links
Main draw
Qualifying draw

Women's Singles
Dubai Singles
2019 in Emirati tennis
2019 Dubai Tennis Championships - Women's Singles